The Wayside Inn is a historic inn in Sudbury, Massachusetts, United States. The inn is included on the National Register of Historic Places as part of the listed Wayside Inn Historic District. It became an inn, called Howe's Tavern, in 1716, making it the oldest continuously operating inn in the United States. The Beekman Arms Inn and others make various claims towards being "continuously operating", resulting from The Wayside Inn's closure period of 1861-1897, after the death of Lyman Howe.

History
The inn's archive has documents from 1686 onward, including the official inn license granted to the first innkeeper, David Howe, in 1716. His son, Ezekiel Howe, was the next innkeeper and fought in the Revolutionary War with the Sudbury Minutemen.

Two slaves are known to have lived at the inn: a man named "Portsmouth" and an unnamed girl were purchased in 1773 and 1779, respectively, by Ezekiel Howe. Lyman Howe, a fifth-generation owner of the property, died unmarried and without children in 1861.

In 1862, the poet Henry Wadsworth Longfellow visited the inn with his publisher James T. Fields shortly after it had become the Red Horse Tavern. He noted it was "a rambling, tumble-down building, two hundred years old; and till now in the family of the Howes". He soon set his compilation of poems Tales of a Wayside Inn here and originally considered titling it Sudbury Tales. The book, published in 1863, was presented as a series of stories told by several guests at the inn and included the poem "Paul Revere's Ride" as "The Landlord's Tale".

In 1893, Homer Rogers and S. Herbert Howe took over ownership of the Inn. Rogers was the first person outside of the Howe family to own the Inn, which was built after King Philip's War. Howe and Rogers spent a considerable amount of money renovating and improving the building. In 1897 the tavern was purchased by Edward R. Lemon, who again converted it into an inn.

Henry Ford was the last private owner of the inn. He purchased it in 1923, from Cora Lemon. The following year, he purchased 3,000 acres (12 km2) of land surrounding the inn, from John D. Pearmain, with the aim of developing it into a historically oriented village and museum. "He fell in love with it at first sight," said John W. Burke, the Ford family chauffeur of 42 years upon his retirement in 1956 at the age of 65.

Although his original aims were not accomplished at the Wayside, he did establish the non-profit institution that operates the inn and associated museum, watermill, and archives today. He also established the Wayside Inn Boys School, a trade school which operated from 1928 to 1947, aiming to demonstrate his belief that "the only way to really learn is by doing." All told, Ford claimed to have invested $1,616,956.11 to the project. Ford sold the Wayside property in 1945, ultimately fulfilling his desires to create such a museum at Greenfield Village in Dearborn, Michigan.

Overnight between December 22 and 23, 1955, the inn, full of antiques collected by Ford in the 1920s, was gutted by a fire. An announcement was made that the Ford Foundation would fully restore the Inn. It was rebuilt with many original beams and pieces shortly thereafter.

The inn is still in operation, offering a restaurant, historically accurate guest rooms, and hosting for small receptions.

A guest book (called at various times "Front Door Diaries" or "Hostess Diaries") was kept for many years, including observations of famous people who stayed or dined at the inn, entries written by the guests, and newspaper clippings for context.

Replica
Jesse Winburn built a replica of the inn in Rye, New York, in the late 1920s at the cost of $250,000. It was his final project, however, for he died in 1929, aged 58.

Gallery

See also
National Register of Historic Places listings in Middlesex County, Massachusetts

References

External links

Buildings and structures in Sudbury, Massachusetts
National Register of Historic Places in Middlesex County, Massachusetts
1686 establishments in Massachusetts
Hotels established in 1716
Hotel buildings on the National Register of Historic Places in Massachusetts
Houses on the National Register of Historic Places in Middlesex County, Massachusetts
Greek Revival architecture in Massachusetts
Henry Wadsworth Longfellow